The 2007 Firestone Indy 200 was a race in the 2007 IRL IndyCar Series, held at Nashville Superspeedway. It was originally to be held over 12 -July 14, 2007, as the eleventh round of the seventeen-race calendar. However, persistent rain pushed the race back to July 15, 2007.

Classification

References 
IndyCar Series

Firestone Indy 200
Firestone Indy 200
Firestone Indy 200
Firestone Indy 200